Morganville is an unincorporated community in Dade County, in the U.S. state of Georgia.

History
A post office called Morganville was established in 1866, and remained in operation until 1913. The community was named after the local Morgan family of settlers.

References

Unincorporated communities in Dade County, Georgia